
Gmina Siewierz is an urban-rural gmina (administrative district) in Będzin County, Silesian Voivodeship, in southern Poland.

Villages
Apart from the town of Siewierz, Gmina Siewierz contains the villages and settlements of Brudzowice, Czekanka, Dzierżawa, Dziewki, Gołuchowice, Hektary, Kuźnica Piaskowa, Kuźnica Podleśna, Kuźnica Warężyńska, Leśniaki, Marcinków, Nowa Wioska, Podwarężyn, Podwarpie, Przedwarężyn, Słowik, Tuliszów, Warężyn, Wojkowice Kościelne, Zawarpie and Żelisławice.

Neighbouring gminas
Gmina Siewierz is bordered by the towns of Dąbrowa Górnicza, Myszków and Poręba, and by the gminas of Koziegłowy, Łazy, Mierzęcice and Ożarowice.

Twin towns – sister cities

Gmina Siewierz is twinned with:
 Edelény, Hungary

References

Siewierz
Będzin County